The 2006 United States House of Representatives election in Wyoming was held on November 7, 2006 to determine who will represent the state of Wyoming in the United States House of Representatives. Wyoming has one, at large district in the House, apportioned according to the 2000 United States Census, due to its low population. Representatives are elected for two-year terms.

Major candidates

Democratic 
Gary Trauner, businessman

Republican 
Barbara Cubin, incumbent U.S. Congresswoman

Results

References 

CNN
Washington Post

2006 Wyoming elections
Wyoming

2006